Sogn and Fjordane University College (HiSF) was a Norwegian state institution of higher education, in the county of Sogn og Fjordane. The college is now part of Høgskulen på Vestlandet.

History 
The university college's campuses were located in Sogndal and Førde, and had approximately 3,800 students and 300 employees.

Sogn og Fjordane University College was divided into four faculties: Faculty of Engineering and Science, Faculty of Health Studies, Faculty of Social Sciences and Faculty of Teacher Education and Sports.

References 

 Sogn og Fjordane University College (English)

Western Norway University of Applied Sciences
Education in Vestland
Buildings and structures in Vestland
Sogndal
Educational institutions established in 1994
1994 establishments in Norway